Alton Adelbert Powers (July 5, 1950 – April 6, 2015), known professionally as Ben Powers, was an American actor. Powers was best known for his role as Keith Albert Anderson, the husband of Thelma Evans, during the sixth and final season of the  CBS sitcom Good Times. Powers was also a cast member on the NBC television comedy series Laugh-In (1977–78).

Powers died on April 6, 2015, at age 64 due to liver cancer.

Biography
Powers was born in New York City, in Brooklyn, and raised in Providence, Rhode Island. He attended the Rhode Island School of Design. Powers got his first break  in the 1970s with Adrian Hall, director at Trinity Repertory Theater in Providence, Rhode Island, his hometown. In addition to stage acting, Powers did stand-up comedy, performed impressions, and sang standards as well as original music he wrote. He was discovered by a Hollywood agent in Providence, signed on to do movies, and entertained at the Playboy clubs in Las Vegas, New York, and Boston. After Good Times, Powers guest starred on a number of popular TV dramas and sitcom shows of the 1980s including Gimme a Break!, Flamingo Road, The Greatest American Hero, The New Odd Couple and Laverne & Shirley. Powers was also a regular on the CBS-TV hit detective drama show Mickey Spillane's Mike Hammer in 1984–85, until the star, Stacy Keach, was arrested in London for cocaine smuggling and the show was canceled while Keach did time in England. Powers left the Hollywood scene at the end of 1985, before the detective series was picked up again. In the early 1980s, Powers appeared in a handful of big-screen films which included Cheech and Chong's Next Movie, Things Are Tough All Over and The Man Who Loved Women as well as a number of made-for-TV movies, mostly in smaller supporting roles.

Death
Powers died of liver cancer on April 6, 2015, at the age of 64 and was cremated.

Filmography

References

External links

1950 births
2015 deaths
African-American male actors
American male film actors
American male television actors
American impressionists (entertainers)
People from Yonkers, New York
People from Brooklyn
Actors from Providence, Rhode Island
Male actors from Rhode Island
Male actors from New York City
20th-century American male actors
Rhode Island School of Design alumni
Comedians from New York City
20th-century American comedians
20th-century African-American people
21st-century African-American people